Farm electricity can refer to:

Rural electrification
Electrical energy efficiency on United States farms
Solar farm
Wind farm